Concepción is a municipality in the Sololá department of Guatemala.  The outstanding characteristic of the municipality is that 100% of its inhabitants are native people.

History

Spanish Colony

There is not any exact record of the exact foundation date of the town;  it is known, however, that there was a time that it was called "Concepción Quechelaj" and "Concepción Paquixalá" according to several documents form the Spanish Colony era. The word "Quechelaj" is from the kakchikel language and means "River of thorns". After the Spanish conquest of Guatemala the town was called "Nuestra Señora de La Concepción" after the Our Lady of the Immaculate Conception. However, the town changed name several times after that.

During the Spanish Colony it was part of the Tecpán Atitlán district and when Tecpán became an "alcaldía mayor" (English:Major municipality) of Sololá Nuestra Señora de La Concepción became part of it, as reported in 1749. Documents from 1765 show its name as "Nuestra Señora de la Concepción Pajixolá". And in 1770, archbishop Pedro Cortés y Larraz described the town as "Concepción Kixalá, part of San Francisco Panajachel parish".

After Independence from Spain

According to a record from 1892, Concepción is reported as a municipality of Sololá Department.

21st century

On 11 October 2015, a little over a month after the municipal elections for the 2016–20 mayoral term, an angry mob lynched and murdered re-elected Mayor Basilio Juracán, from the LIDER party, accusing him of allegedly ordering a hit against his former competitor for the mayor office from the Unidad Nacional de la Esperanza party —UNE—; the mob burned two vehicles and three houses, among those the one where the deceased mayor was hiding.

Climate

Concepción has temperate climate (Köppen: Csb).

Geographic location 

The municipal capital is 6 km away from Sololá and 146 km away of Guatemala City.

See also
 
 
 List of places in Guatemala

Notes and references

References

Bibliography

 

Municipalities of the Sololá Department